Arjan Moen (born 9 July 1977) is a former Dutch professional darts player, who played in Professional Darts Corporation events.

Career
Moen qualified for the 2003 PDC World Darts Championship, but lost at the Last 40 stage to Shayne Burgess.

World Championship performances

PDC
 2003: Last 40: (lost to Shayne Burgess 2–4)

References

External links

1977 births
Living people
Dutch darts players
Professional Darts Corporation associate players